Necklace splitting is a picturesque name given to several related problems in combinatorics and measure theory. Its name and solutions are due to mathematicians Noga Alon and  Douglas B. West.

The basic setting involves a necklace with beads of different colors. The necklace should be divided between several partners (e.g. thieves), such that each partner receives the same amount of every color. Moreover, the number of cuts should be as small as possible (in order to waste as little as possible of the metal in the links between the beads).

Variants 
The following variants of the problem have been solved in the original paper:

Discrete splitting: The necklace has  beads. The beads come in  different colors. There are  beads of each color , where  is a positive integer. Partition the necklace into  parts (not necessarily contiguous), each of which has exactly  beads of color i. Use at most  cuts. Note that if the beads of each color are contiguous on the necklace, then at least  cuts must be done inside each color, so  is optimal.
Continuous splitting:  The necklace is the real interval . Each point of the interval is colored in one of  different colors. Partition the interval to  parts (not necessarily contiguous), such that in each part, the total length of color  is exactly . Use at most  cuts.
Measure splitting:  The necklace is a real interval. There are  different measures on the interval, all absolutely continuous with respect to length. Partition the interval to  parts (not necessarily contiguous), such that the measure of each part, according to measure , is exactly . Use at most  cuts. This is a generalization of the Hobby–Rice theorem, and it is used to get an exact division of a cake.

Each problem can be solved by the next problem: 
 Discrete splitting can be solved by continuous splitting, since a discrete necklace can be converted to a coloring of the real interval  in which each interval of length 1 is colored by the color of the corresponding bead. In case the continuous splitting tries to cut inside beads, the cuts can be slid gradually such that they are made only between beads.
 Continuous splitting can be solved by measure splitting, since a coloring of an interval in  colors can be converted to a set  measures, such that measure  measures the total length of color . The opposite is also true: measure splitting can be solved by continuous splitting, using a more sophisticated reduction.

Proof
The case  can be proved by the Borsuk-Ulam theorem.

When  is an odd prime number, the proof involves a generalization of the Borsuk-Ulam theorem.

When  is a composite number, the proof is as follows (demonstrated for the measure-splitting variant). Suppose . Using  cuts, divide the necklace to  parts such that measure  of each part is exactly . Using  cuts, divide each part to  parts such that measure  of each part is exactly . All in all, there are now  parts such that measure  of each part is exactly . The total number of cuts is  plus  which is exactly .

Further results

Splitting random necklaces

In some cases, random necklaces can be split equally using fewer cuts. Mathematicians Noga Alon, Dor Elboim, Gábor Tardos and János Pach studied the typical number of cuts required to split a random necklace between two thieves. In the model they considered, a necklace is chosen uniformly at random from the set of necklaces with t colors and m beads of each color. As m tends to infinity, the probability that the necklace can be split using  cuts or less tends to zero while the probability that it's possible to split with  cuts is bounded away from zero. More precisely, letting X=X(t,m) be the minimal number of cuts required to split the necklace. The following holds as m tends to infinity. For any 

For any 

Finally, when  is odd and 

One can also consider the case in which the number of colors tends to infinity. When m=1 and the t tends to infinity, the number of cuts required is at most 0.4t and at least 0.22t with high probability. It is conjectured that there exists some 0.22<c<0.4 such that X(t,1)/t  converges to c in distribution.

One cut fewer than needed

In the case of two thieves [i.e. k = 2] and t colours, a fair split would require at most t cuts.  If, however, only t − 1 cuts are available, Hungarian mathematician Gábor Simonyi shows that the two thieves can achieve an almost fair division in the following sense.

If the necklace is arranged so that no t-split is possible, then for any two subsets D1 and D2 of { 1, 2, ...,  t }, not both empty, such that , a (t − 1)-split exists such that:

 If colour , then partition 1 has more beads of colour i than partition 2;
 If colour , then partition 2 has more beads of colour i than partition 1;
 If colour i is in neither partition, both partitions have equally many beads of colour i.

This means that if the thieves have preferences in the form of two "preference" sets D1 and D2, not both empty, there exists a (t − 1)-split so that thief 1 gets more beads of types in his preference set D1 than thief 2; thief 2 gets more beads of types in her preference set D2 than thief 1; and the rest are equal.

Simonyi credits Gábor Tardos with noticing that the result above is a direct generalization of Alon's original necklace theorem in the case k = 2.  Either the necklace has a (t − 1)-split, or it does not.  If it does, there is nothing to prove.  If it does not, we may add beads of a fictitious colour to the necklace, and make D1 consist of the fictitious colour and D2 empty.  Then Simonyi's result shows that there is a t-split with equal numbers of each real colour.

Negative result 
For every  there is a measurable -coloring of the real line such that no interval can be fairly split using at most  cuts.

Splitting multidimensional necklaces

The result can be generalized to n probability measures defined on a d  dimensional cube with any combination of n(k − 1) hyperplanes parallel to the sides for k thieves.

Approximation algorithm
An approximation algorithm for splitting a necklace can be derived from an algorithm for consensus halving.

See also 
 Combinatorial necklaces
 Necklace problem
 Exact division

References

External links
 , an introductory video presenting the problem with its topological solution.

Combinatorics on words
Discrete geometry
Fair division
Mathematical problems